A Lullaby for the Devil is the fifth full-length studio album by the progressive metal band Deadsoul Tribe. It was released on 11 September 2007 by InsideOut Music. The initial pressing of the album will include a multimedia section with acoustic live material. The cover artwork is a hidden tribute to Ian Anderson of Jethro Tull, his typical pose with a flute from the 70s like a Pied-Piper (ratcatcher).

Track listing 
 "Psychosphere" − 3:36
 "Goodbye City Life" − 8:27
 "Here Come the Pigs" − 4:01
 "Lost in You" − 4:55
 "A Stairway to Nowhere" − 6:35
 "The Gossamer Strand" − 6:21
 "Any Sign at All" − 6:17
 "Fear" − 4:24
 "Further Down" − 2:57
 "A Lullaby for the Devil" − 6:13

Credits 
 Devon Graves − lead vocals, guitar, flute
 Roland Ivenz − bass
 Adel Moustafa − drums
 Roland Kerschbaumer − guitar

References

Deadsoul Tribe albums
2007 albums
Inside Out Music albums